John McEnroe and Mark Woodforde were the defending champions, but none competed this year.

Pieter Aldrich and Danie Visser won the title by defeating Paul Annacone and Christo van Rensburg 6–4, 6–3 in the final.

Seeds

Draw

Draw

References

External links
 Official results archive (ATP)
 Official results archive (ITF)

Doubles